Stelis lateralis is a species of bee in the family Megachilidae. It is found in Central America and North America.

Subspecies
These two subspecies belong to the species Stelis lateralis:
 Stelis lateralis lateralis
 Stelis lateralis permaculata Cockerell

References

Further reading

External links

 

Megachilidae
Articles created by Qbugbot
Insects described in 1864